The Lankesa is a river in central Lithuania. It is a left tributary of the Obelis.

It begins nearby Reniūnai village in Ukmergė District Municipality, then flows to the south west through Jonava District Municipality. After a confluence with the Medukšna it turns to the north west and runs through Kėdainiai District Municipality till it meets the Obelis in Valkaičiai.

After bigger rains it often overflows own course. It often dries out during summers and freezes up to the bottom during winters.

Gaižūnai, Pasraučiai, Martyniškis, Žeimių GS, Palankesiai, Žeimiai, Užkapiai, Vainiūnai, Stašaičiai settlements are located on the banks of the Lankesa. At its confluence with the Obelis the Stašaičiai hillfort stands.

The hydronym Lankesa derives either from Lithuanian word lanka ('flood-meadow'), or from lankas, lankstas ('bend, crook').

References

 LIETUVOS RESPUBLIKOS UPIŲ IR TVENKINIŲ KLASIFIKATORIUS (Republic of Lithuania- River and Pond Classifications).  Ministry of Environment (Lithuania). Accessed 2011-11-17.

Rivers of Lithuania
Kėdainiai District Municipality
Jonava District Municipality
Ukmergė District Municipality